Eva Twardokens (born April 28, 1965, in Reno, Nevada) is a former World Cup alpine ski racer.  She made her World Cup debut at age 17 in December 1982.

Two seasons later, Twardokens was the bronze medalist in the giant slalom at the 1985 World Championships, and represented the U.S. in two Winter Olympics (1992, 1994). On the World Cup circuit, she had three podiums and 34 top ten finishes. She retired from international competition following the 1995 season.

In 2007, Twardokens won the Masters National Weightlifting Champion in the 40-45 age group in the  class, with a  snatch and a  clean and jerk for a  total.

She was inducted to the US Ski and Snowboard Hall of Fame class of 2011 on April 14, 2012.

Her father, Jerzy Twardokens, is an Olympian who fenced for Poland in the 1952 Olympics. He defected to the United States in Philadelphia in 1958. and was a professor at the University of Nevada in Reno.

In February 2019, Twardokens was seriously injured in a private plane crash near Watsonville, California.

World Cup results

Season standings

Race podiums
 3 podiums – (2 GS, 1 SG), 34 top tens

World Championship results

Olympic results

References

External links

 Eva Twardokens World Cup standings at the International Ski Federation
 
 
U.S. Ski & Snowboard Hall of Fame – Eva Twardokens

1965 births
Living people
American female alpine skiers
Alpine skiers at the 1992 Winter Olympics
Alpine skiers at the 1994 Winter Olympics
Olympic alpine skiers of the United States
Sportspeople from Reno, Nevada
American people of Polish descent
21st-century American women
People from Olympic Valley, California